"Emotionless" is a song by the American rock band Red Sun Rising. It was released on January 4, 2016 on their third album Polyester Zeal as the second single. A longer version of the song was previously released on their EP "Into Forever."

Charts

See also
List of Billboard Mainstream Rock number-one songs of the 2010s

References

2015 songs
2016 singles
Razor & Tie singles
Song recordings produced by Bob Marlette